Richard Andrew Cooper (born 7 August 1972) is a former English cricketer.  Cooper was a right-handed batsman who bowled right-arm fast-medium.  He was born at Stoke-on-Trent, Staffordshire.

Cooper made his debut for Staffordshire in the 2001 MCCA Knockout Trophy against the Derbyshire Cricket Board.  Cooper played Minor counties cricket for Staffordshire from 2001 to 2006, which included 25 Minor Counties Championship matches and fourteen MCCA Knockout Trophy matches.  In 2001, he made his List A debut against the Worcestershire Cricket Board in the Cheltenham & Gloucester Trophy.  It was however in the 2002 Cheltenham & Gloucester Trophy that Cooper was to stand out with the ball, taking 11 wickets to emerge as the tournaments leading wicket-taker, despite playing just three matches.  It was in the 1st round match against Hertfordshire that Cooper took his only five wicket haul in List A cricket, taking figures of 5/42.  He played two further List A matches for Staffordshire, against the Hampshire Cricket Board in the 2nd round of the 2003 Cheltenham & Gloucester Trophy which was played in 2002, and Surrey in the following round.  In his six List A matches, he took 14 wickets at an average of 16.42.

On 15th Nov 2022 Richard Cooper was included in the England Over 50's team to tour South Africa in 2023

References

External links
Richard Cooper at ESPNcricinfo
Richard Cooper at CricketArchive

1972 births
Living people
Cricketers from Stoke-on-Trent
English cricketers
Staffordshire cricketers